Cheiridella is a genus of leaf beetles in the subfamily Eumolpinae. They are known from Africa.

Species
 Cheiridella principis Zoia, 2017 – Príncipe, São Tomé
 Cheiridella zambesiana Jacoby, 1904 – "Estcourt, Natal" (type locality)

References

Eumolpinae
Chrysomelidae genera
Beetles of Africa
Taxa named by Martin Jacoby